The 1914–15 Austrian First Class season was the fourth season of top-tier football in Austria. It was won by Wiener AC.

League standings

Results

References
Austria - List of final tables (RSSSF)

Austrian Football Bundesliga seasons
Austria
1914–15 in Austrian football